A secretary is usually an administrative support worker.

Secretary may also refer to:

Positions
Secretary (title), an official title for various positions of leadership

Government
 Secretary to the Government of India, an administrative head of a ministry or a department
 Cabinet Secretary
 Secretary of State, in several countries, a senior government position
 Departmental secretary, the most senior public servant of an Australian government ministry
 Parliamentary secretary, a junior minister 
 Permanent secretary, the most senior public servant of a government ministry
 A diplomatic rank
 Secretary to the President of the United States
 Principal Secretary (disambiguation)
 Private Secretary to the Sovereign, United Kingdom
 Private secretary, a public servant working for a minister

Head or official in organizations
 First Secretary (disambiguation)
 General Secretary 
 Party Committee Secretary
 Secretary-General
 Secretary (club), the head of an organization's day-to-day administration
 Company secretary, a senior, usually board level, position in a private or public company
 Mishu, a private secretary to officials in the Chinese Communist Party

Places
 Secretary, Maryland, a town in the United States
 Secretary Island, an island of New Zealand

Books
 The Secretary, a poem by Matthew Prior written at The Hague, in  1696 
 The Secretary, a poem by Peter Redgrove

Film and television
 Secretary (1976 film), a 1976 Indian Telugu-language film directed by K.S. Prakash Rao
 Secretary (2002 film), a 2002 American film directed by Steven Shainber and starring Maggie Gyllenhaal and James Spader
 Secretary (2006 film), a 2006 Australian television film
 The Secretary (1938 film), a 1938 Indian Hindi-language film directed by Chaturbhuj Doshi
 The Secretary (1995 film), a 1995 American film directed by Andrew Lane
 "The Secretary" (Seinfeld), an episode of the television series Seinfeld
 Private Secretary (TV series), an American situation comedy starring Ann Sothern

Music
"Secretary", a song by Betty Wright, 1974
"The Secretary", a song by Sailor (band), 1990

Other uses
 Secretarybird, an African bird of prey
 Secretary desk, a desk with a hinged surface
 Secretary hand, a style of European handwriting developed in the early sixteenth century
 The Secretary (play), an 1843 play by James Sheridan Knowles

See also
 General secretary
 Company secretary
 Secretariat (disambiguation)
 Personal assistant
 Undersecretary